Erdi Bakırcı (born 29 May 1989) is a Turkish footballer who plays for TFF Third League club 68 Aksaray Belediyespor.

References

External links
 
 
 
 Erdi Bakırcı at msn.com

1989 births
People from Gaziosmanpaşa
Footballers from Istanbul
Living people
Turkish footballers
Turkey youth international footballers
Association football defenders
Sarıyer S.K. footballers
Adıyamanspor footballers
Yeni Malatyaspor footballers
Aydınspor footballers
Fethiyespor footballers
Kahramanmaraşspor footballers
Batman Petrolspor footballers
TFF Second League players
TFF Third League players